Hayley Maddick (born 25 May 1992) is an Australian rugby league footballer who plays as a  for the Brisbane Broncos in the NRL Women's Premiership.

Background
Born on the Sunshine Coast, Queensland, Maddick played touch football for Caboolture and later the Brisbane Broncos NRL Touch Premiership side before switching to rugby league. In 2019, she was named the competition's Player of the Year.

Playing career
In 2020, Maddick played for the Brisbane Broncos at the NRL Nines in Perth. Later that year, she played for the Souths Logan Magpies in the Holcim Cup.

In 2021, she joined the Valleys Diehards in the QRL Women's Premiership. In August 2021, she signed with the Broncos for the 2021 NRL Women's Premiership season, which was later postponed.

In Round 2 of the 2021 NRL Women's season, Maddick made her debut for the Broncos in a win over the Newcastle Knights.

References

External links
Brisbane Broncos profile

1992 births
Living people
Australian female rugby league players
Rugby league fullbacks
Brisbane Broncos (NRLW) players
People from Queensland